Paranamera oculata is a species of beetle in the family Cerambycidae. It was described by Karl-Ernst Hüdepohl in 1994. It is known from Thailand and Myanmar.

References

Lamiini
Beetles described in 1994